Martin Cross (born 19 October 1939) is a former Australian rules footballer who played in the Victorian Football League (VFL).

Martin Cross joined Carlton in 1961 from North Ballarat, Where he played 96 games in the Ballarat League prior to crossing to Carlton.

He was a right-foot kick who baulked and turned well, and had all the requirements of a top-class rover.

Cross was 20th man in the 1962 Carlton Grand Final team, that was beaten by Essendon by 32 points.
                 
He later coached in the Ovens & Murray League, steering Myrtleford to a premiership in 1970 as captain-coach. Cross also coached North Albury.

His son-in-law Ben Hollands and grandsons Elijah Hollands and Oliver (Ollie) Hollands also played professional Australian rules football, with Elijah drafted to the Gold Coast in 2020 and Ollie drafted to Carlton in 2022.

References

External links
 Martin Cross at Blueseum

Carlton Football Club players
Myrtleford Football Club players
North Ballarat Football Club players
Australian rules footballers from Victoria (Australia)
1939 births
Living people